Sean J. Casey  (born May 16, 1963) is a Canadian politician from Prince Edward Island, Canada. Casey was elected to the House of Commons of Canada in the 2011 federal election as the Liberal Member of Parliament for the riding of Charlottetown. Casey previously served as the president of the Prince Edward Island Liberal Party.

Early career
Casey was born in St. John's, Newfoundland and educated at St. Francis Xavier University and Dalhousie Law School. He joined the firm Stewart McKelvey in 1989 (which also included Shawn Murphy, the man he would subsequently replace as MP for Charlottetown), and was made a partner in 1993.  From 2003 to 2008 he was president of the Paderno Group of Companies, before returning to Stewart McKelvey as the firm's managing partner, until his resignation to run for office in 2011.  From 2009 to 2010, he served as the president of the Greater Charlottetown Area Chamber of Commerce.  He was also active as a volunteer in both soccer and minor hockey.

Politics
Casey's first prominent role in politics came when he served as President of the PEI Liberal Party from 2003 to 2007. He did not reoffer as president after completing his term in 2007, after the party's victory in the 2007 election, stating that with their forming the government after nearly eleven years in opposition, he had accomplished what he had set out to.

When four-term incumbent Shawn Murphy announced his intention not to run in the next election, Casey announced his candidacy. He was unopposed for the nomination, and won the general election with nearly 40% of the vote.  Casey was one of only two new Liberal MPs elected in the 2011 election (the other being Ted Hsu in Kingston and the Islands).

Casey served as the Liberal Party's Justice critic during the 41st Parliament.  He was reelected to a second term in the 2015 election.

He was re-elected in 2015, and again most recently in 2019. In Parliament, Sean has served as the Parliamentary Secretary to the Minister of Fisheries, Oceans, and the Canadian Coast Guard. He has previously served as the Parliamentary Secretary to the Minister of Justice and Attorney General of Canada, as well as the Parliamentary Secretary to the Minister of Canadian Heritage as well as Chair of the Atlantic Liberal Caucus.

He is currently the Chair of the Standing Committee on Human Resources, Skills and Social Development and the Status of Persons with Disabilities and a member of the Standing Committee on Veterans Affairs.

Electoral record

References

External links
Sean Casey

1963 births
Dalhousie University alumni
Lawyers in Prince Edward Island
Liberal Party of Canada MPs
Living people
Members of the House of Commons of Canada from Prince Edward Island
People from Charlottetown
Politicians from St. John's, Newfoundland and Labrador
St. Francis Xavier University alumni
21st-century Canadian politicians